Jared "Jed" Sarwat Yehia Chouman (born 19 March 1993) is a former footballer who played as a defender or midfielder. Born in England, Chouman is of Lebanese descent and has represented Lebanon internationally.

Club career

Safa 
Chouman played in the Lebanese Premier League for Safa between 2013 and 2015. He first represented Safa at the 2013 AFC Cup, playing three games as a substitute in the group stage. In the 2013–14 season, he played eight league games, as well as one game in the 2014 AFC Cup as a starter, scoring a goal against Tajik club Ravshan Kulob on 23 April 2014 in an 8–0 win.

In the 2014–15 season, Chouman played 10 league games. He helped Safa win the Lebanese Super Cup in 2013, and finish second in the Lebanese Elite Cup in 2014.

England 
Between 2015 and 2018, Chouman played for Hornchurch in the Isthmian League Division One North. He played 23 games in 2017–18, before being ruled out with injury for one year. On 16 July 2019, Chouman joined Isthmian League South Central Division side Barking, where he played four game in all competitions in 2019–20.

International career 
Chouman played for the Lebanon national under-20 team at the 2013 Jeux de la Francophonie. In 2015 he played for the under-23s in the 2016 AFC U-23 Championship qualification.

Chouman played for the senior team in three friendly games in 2014, against Qatar, Saudi Arabia, and the United Arab Emirates.

Honours
Safa
 Lebanese Super Cup: 2013
 Lebanese Elite Cup runner-up: 2014

Hornchurch
 Isthmian League North Division: 2017–18

See also 
 List of Lebanon international footballers born outside Lebanon

References

External links
 Jed Chouman at footballwebpages.co.uk (2019–2020)
 Jed Chouman at footballwebpages.co.uk (2015–2018)
  (2013–2015)
  (2014–2015)
 

1993 births
Living people
Footballers from the London Borough of Newham
Lebanese footballers
English footballers
English people of Lebanese descent
Sportspeople of Lebanese descent
Association football defenders
Association football midfielders
Safa SC players
Hornchurch F.C. players
Barking F.C. players
Lebanese Premier League players
Isthmian League players
Lebanon youth international footballers
Lebanon international footballers